During the 1980–81 English football season, Brentford competed in the Football League Third Division. In a mid-table season, the Bees drew a club-record 19 league matches.

Season summary 

After narrowly saving Brentford from relegation to the Fourth Division at the end of the previous season, interim manager Fred Callaghan was given the job on a full-time basis, with Ron Harris appointed as his assistant. Callaghan conducted a clear-out of the squad, releasing captain Jackie Graham and bit-part players Doug Allder, Allan Glover, Billy Holmes and Trevor Porter. Aside from Ron Harris (who would continue his playing career), Callaghan brought in five new players, with £20,000 laid out on midfielders David Crown, Terry Hurlock and Barry Silkman. £55,000 was generated from the sales of forwards Steve Phillips and Lee Holmes, but Callaghan was presented with a problem when Len Bond, Barry Tucker, John Fraser and Dave Carlton, mainstays of the team for the previous two years, refused to sign new contracts. All but Tucker would depart Griffin Park during the early months of the season, with Bond fetching a £12,000 fee.

Brentford had a mixed start to the season, exiting the League Cup at the first hurdle, but three wins and two draws from six matches in September 1980 put the club in 6th position. Gradually the season played itself out into one of consolidation in mid-table, with Callaghan continuing to overhaul his squad. Forwards Gary Johnson and Lee Frost arrived from Chelsea in December 1980 for a £30,000 fee, while squad members Willie Graham, Iori Jenkins and Dean Smith were released in February 1981. Brentford ended the season in 9th place, off the back of a run of just two defeats in the final 21 matches. Bob Booker finished the season as the team's top scorer in league matches, with a meagre seven goals.

Four club records were set or equalled during the season:
 Most Football League draws in a season: 19
 Most Football League away draws in a season: 10
 Most consecutive away Football League draws: 6 (27 December 1980 – 7 March 1981)
 Most consecutive away Football League clean sheets: 4 (6 September – 8 October 1980)

League table

Results
Brentford's goal tally listed first.

Legend

Pre-season and friendlies

Football League Third Division

FA Cup

Football League Cup 

 Sources: 100 Years of Brentford, The Big Brentford Book of the Eighties,Croxford, Lane & Waterman, p. 386-389. Statto

Playing squad 
Players' ages are as of the opening day of the 1980–81 season.

 Sources: The Big Brentford Book of the Eighties, Timeless Bees

Coaching staff

Statistics

Appearances and goals
Substitute appearances in brackets.

Players listed in italics left the club mid-season.
Source: The Big Brentford Book of the Eighties

Goalscorers 

Players listed in italics left the club mid-season.
Source: The Big Brentford Book of the Eighties

Management

Summary

Transfers & loans

Awards 
 Supporters' Player of the Year: Terry Hurlock
 Players' Player of the Year: Terry Hurlock

Notes

References 

Brentford F.C. seasons
Brentford